Clorinde (minor planet designation: 282 Clorinde) is a typical Main belt asteroid. It was discovered by Auguste Charlois on 28 January 1889 in Nice. It was named after Clorinda, the heroine of Torquato Tasso's poem Jerusalem Delivered.

This differs substantially from previous studies.

References

External links
 
 

Background asteroids
Clorinde
Clorinde
BFU::-type asteroids (Tholen)
B-type asteroids (SMASS)
18890128